Daniel Edward Jessee (February 22, 1901 – April 30, 1970) was an American professional baseball player and coach of college football and college baseball. He appeared in one Major League Baseball game as a pinch runner for the Cleveland Indians on August 14 during the 1929 Cleveland Indians season. Jessee served as the head football coach at Trinity College in Hartford, Connecticut from 1932 to 1966, compiling a record of 150–76–7. He also had two stints as Trinity's head baseball coach, from 1935 to 1961 and 1963, to 1967, tallying a mark of 239–170–5. Jessee/Miller Field, the home stadium of the Trinity Bantams football team was named for Jessee in 1966 and now also honors his successor as head football coach, Don Miller.

Jessee attended Pacific University in Forest Grove, Oregon, where he played football, basketball, and baseball. He earned a master's degree in physical education from Columbia University in 1932. Jessee died on April 30, 1970, in Venice, Florida.

Head coaching record

Football

References

External links
 
 

1901 births
1970 deaths
Baseball shortstops
Baseball third basemen
Bloomington Cubs players
Cleveland Indians players
Decatur Commodores players
Jersey City Skeeters players
Pacific Boxers baseball players
Pacific Boxers football players
Pacific Boxers men's basketball players
Salt Lake City Bees players
Seattle Indians players
Trinity Bantams baseball coaches
Trinity Bantams football coaches
Columbia University alumni
People from Carter County, Kentucky
Baseball players from Kentucky